Darryl Raynard Richardson III (born January 19, 1984), better known by his stage name Lil Scrappy, is an American rapper.

Richardson was discovered by producer and performer Lil Jon while performing at a bar in their respective hometown of Atlanta. Along with labelmates Trillville, Lil Scrappy was one of the first signings to Lil Jon's BME Recordings. Richardson has built a strong reputation and eager following throughout the Atlanta hip hop scene and throughout the Southeastern United States through various mixtape releases.

Career

2004–2008: Bred 2 Die Born 2 Live
Lil Scrappy's first album, The King of Crunk & BME Recordings Present: Trillville & Lil Scrappy (2004), was a split-release, with Trillville songs representing one "side" of the disk and Lil Scrappy songs representing the other. The album reached #12 on the Billboard 200.

Lil Scrappy's debut album Bred 2 Die Born 2 Live was released on December 5, 2006 on Reprise Records. The album was produced by Lil Jon and features appearances by 50 Cent, Bohagon, Lil Jon, Olivia, Three 6 Mafia, Young Buck, Young Dro, and Yung Joc. The first single "Money in the Bank" features Young Buck and became Lil Scrappy's second Top 30 single. Money in the Bank peaked at number 28 on the Billboard Hot 100 chart, becoming his biggest solo hit and most commercially successful single to date in the U.S. as it surpassed the peak position of "No Problem" by one position. The second single from the album is called "Gangsta Gangsta" and features Lil Jon. "Oh Yeah (Work)" is the third single from Bred 2 Die Born 2 Live and features E-40 and Sean P (formerly Sean Paul) of YoungbloodZ.

Lil Scrappy's second album, Prince of the South, was released on May 13, 2008, through Real Talk Entertainment.

2009–2012: Tha Grustle
Lil Scrappy joined the Disturbing tha Peace label in April 2009. Though still filming the motion picture Just Another Day, he was expected to tour that summer to promote his fourth studio album, Tha Grustle, after filming was complete. In November 2011, with the album still unreleased, he announced he'd left Disturbing the Peace and that the album would be released by Bonzi Records in 2012.

Lil Scrappy's second independent album, Prince of the South 2, was released on October 19, 2010, through Real Talk Entertainment just like his first independent album. On September 8, 2009, Lil Scrappy released the first single from the album entitled "Addicted To Money" but it failed to reach the Billboard charts so it was dubbed as a promo single. Then on September 28, 2010, Lil Scrappy released the first album from the single"Bad (That's Her)" which featured Stuey Rock but it also failed to reach the Billboard charts so it was dubbed as a promo single.

2012–present: Love & Hip Hop: Atlanta
Since 2012, Lil Scrappy has appeared on seven seasons of Love & Hip Hop Atlanta.

Discography

Studio albums
 Bred 2 Die · Born 2 Live (2006)
 Prince of the South (2008)
 Prince of the South 2 (2010)
 Tha Grustle (2012)
 Confident (2018)

Collaboration albums
 The King of Crunk & BME Recordings Present: Trillville & Lil Scrappy (with Trillville) (2004)
 Silence & Secrecy: Black Rag Gang (with G'$ Up Click) (2009)

Filmography

Television

References

External links

 
 Official Lil Scrappy Profile at justRHYMES
 Lil Scrappy at Twitter
 Lil Scrappy at MTV
 
 
 

1982 births
American hip hop musicians
African-American crunk musicians
African-American male rappers
Def Jam Recordings artists
Living people
Rappers from Atlanta
Crunk musicians
Gangsta rappers
African-American record producers
Participants in American reality television series
Rappers from Georgia (U.S. state)
21st-century American rappers
21st-century American male musicians
21st-century African-American musicians
20th-century African-American people